Never Gone is a 2018 Chinese streaming television series based on the novel of the same name by Xin Yiwu. It stars Yang Zishan, Elvis Han, Toby Lee, Su Qing, Lan Yingying and Tan Jianci. The series premiered on Youku on November 6, 2018. It later went on national broadcast and aired on Shandong Television from February 19, 2019.

Synopsis 
Su Yunjin and Cheng Zheng are classmates in high school. Cheng Zheng is attracted to Su Yunjin, but he doesn't know how to express it well and causes Yunjin to misunderstand his true intentions. However over time, Cheng Zheng's concern for Yunjin touches her heart and Yunjin also starts to develop feelings for Cheng Zheng. However, she knows that their personalities and family background are vastly different, so she purposely avoids Cheng Zheng's advancements.

After getting into different colleges, Cheng Zheng refuses to give up and continues to relentlessly pursue Yunjin. They finally get together but the pressures from life after graduation cause a strain in their relationship. Yunjin throws herself into work while Cheng Zheng is frustrated about her lack of time for him. Misunderstandings pile up and causes the couple to separate. However years later, Cheng Zheng reappears in Su Yunjin's life.

Cast

Main
 Yang Zishan as Su Yunjin
 Li Landi as young Su Yujin
 A quiet and introverted girl who suffers from low self-esteem due to her family background. Despite her lack of self-confidence, she remains resolute and firm on her decisions.
 Elvis Han as Cheng Zheng
 Hu Xianxu as young Cheng Zheng
 A confident and outgoing guy who is intelligent, good in sports and comes from a rich family background. Despite his love for Su Yujin, his brashness and lack of sensitivity plays a part in driving their relationship apart.
 Toby Lee as Shen Ju'an
Su Yunjin's college senior and ex-boyfriend, later Zhang Yue's husband. A capable man who manages to become the top student and president of the student body through his hard work and determination. However, his poor family background continues to haunt him, driving him to make the decision of using Zhang Yue's feelings for him to rise up the ranks in Heng Kai.   
 Su Qing as Mo Yuhua
 Li Gengxi as young Mo Yuhua
 Su Yunjin's high school classmate and best friend. An intelligent and introverted student who later becomes a doctor. She has a one-sided love for Zhou Ziyi, and quietly makes sacrifices for him throughout the years. 
 Lan Yingying as Zhang Yue
 Cheng Zheng's cousin. CEO of Hengkai Company. A confident and free-spirited woman. She falls in love with Shen Ju'an and willingly let him make use of her, despite knowing that he does not love her. 
 Tan Jianci as Zhou Ziyi
 Bian Cheng as young Zhou Ziyi
 Cheng Zheng's high school classmate and best friend. A flirtatious playboy who comes from a rich family, but suffers from lack of familial love. Despite knowing that Mo Yuhua loves him, he is unable to reciprocate her feelings.

Supporting
 Wen Xin as Meng Xue
Zhuang Dafei as young Meng Xue
 Cheng Zheng's childhood friend and high school classmate. She has a one-sided love for Cheng Zheng, and continues to pursue him throughout high school and college. She later falls in love with Song Ming.
 Ji Xiaofei as Song Ming
Huang Yi as young Song Ming 
 Meng Xue's high school classmate. He loved Meng Xue since high school, and was finally able to earn her hand in marriage during their adult days.
Wan Guopeng as Jinzi
A guy who comes from the same village as Su Yunjin. He was arranged to attend a matchmaking session with Su Yunjin, but ends up befriending Mo Yuhua and has a crush on her.
Guo Hong as Su Yunjin's mother
Hou Changrong as Su Yunjin's father
Lv Liang as Ding Quan, Su Yunjin's stepfather
Rong Rong as Zhang Jingyin, Cheng Zheng's mother
Wang Kanwei as Cheng Zheng's father
Lin Dongfu as Zhang Jingmeng, Cheng Zheng's uncle and President of Ning Kai
Yuan Ran as An Ran, Su Yunjin's university dorm-mate
Wang Yi'nuo as Liu Yu, Su Yunjin's university dorm-mate
Feng Xinrui as Li Hui, Su Yunjin's university dorm-mate
Xu Linchan as Chen Xiaoyu, Cheng Zheng's university classmate who has a crush on him
Ding Liuyan as Meng Jia, Mo Yuhua's university classmate whom Zhou Ziyi had a crush on
Chen Jie as Chen Jiejie, Zhou Ziyi's wife
Wang Xuan as Lulu, an intern who works for Su Yunjin
He Qing as Sister Guo, Su Yunjin's workplace superior
Hai Tong as Brother Lee, Su Yunjun's workplace senior
Long Zhengxuan as Elsa, Xu Zhiheng's secretary
Zhao Mengjie as Xiaobei, Zhang Yue's assistant
Wang Shuo as Zhou Ziyi's father
Du Zhiqian as Shen Ju'an's mother

Special appearance
 Archie Kao as Xu Zhiheng
 Su Yunjin's boss. He has a strained relationship with his wife, and becomes interested in Su Yunjin and pursues her. 
 Ma Yushu as Hu Yue 
 Xu Zhiheng's wife.

Production
The production team took six months to search for child actors to play the younger counterparts of the main characters. Li Landi, Hu Xianxu, Bian Cheng, Li Gengxi and Zhuang Dafei were selected among 1,000 applicants to play young Su Yunjin, Cheng Zheng, Zhou Ziyi, Mo Yuhua and Meng Xue.

The series began filming at Shanghai in September 2017, and wrapped up filming in December 2017.

Ratings 

 Highest ratings are marked in red, lowest ratings are marked in blue

Reception
The drama received positive reviews during its airing. Despite its "cliche" storyline and differences in plot with the novel, the drama was praised for its heartwarming story, as well as the acting skills and character interpretation of the lead actors.

Awards and nominations

Soundtrack

Spin-off
A 15-episode spin-off of the drama aired on Youku starting November 10, which centers around the lead character's school life. The drama stars the younger versions of the characters, played by Li Landi, Hu Xianxu, Bian Cheng, Li Gengxi and Zhuang Dafei.

References

Chinese romance television series
2018 Chinese television series debuts
Television shows based on Chinese novels
Television series by Tangren Media
Chinese web series
Youku original programming
2018 Chinese television series endings
2018 web series debuts
Shandong Television original programming